Kaili Blues (Roadside Picnic) is a 2015 Chinese film written and directed by Bi Gan. The film follows a rural doctor's search for his nephew. The film won awards at the Locarno Festival, the 52nd Golden Horse Awards, and the Three Continents Festival in Nantes.

Plot
Ex-convict Chen Sheng works as a doctor in a rural community. Chen squabbles with his half-brother Crazy Face about how he neglects his son Weiwei. When Weiwei disappears, Chen believes that Crazy Face may have sold the child into servitude. Chen sets out to Zhenyuan to get Weiwei back. Chen drifts into a mysterious village called Dangmai, in which the past, present, and future mix together.

Production
Most of the cast members are local residents who were nonprofessional actors. Bi incorporated the actors' real lives when developing their characters. The lead character Chen Sheng is portrayed by Bi's uncle Chen Yongzhong, who like the character is a former gangster.

Bi primarily filmed Kaili Blues in his hometown of Kaili City. The scenes in Dangmai were shot in the nearby village of Ping Liang. The film's budget was exhausted after completing the 41-minute long take of Dangmai. To finish the film, Bi assembled a small team to shoot the rest of the film using a portable Blackmagic Pocket Cinema Camera.

Bi originally proposed the title Huang ran lu, after Portuguese author Fernando Pessoa's novel The Book of Disquiet. However, it was rejected as being too downbeat. The film's Chinese title comes from the Strugatsky brothers' novel Roadside Picnic, which Tarkovsky adapted into the 1979 film Stalker.

Release
Kaili Blues premiered on August 11, 2015 at the 68th Locarno Festival. It grossed 930,549 USD total worldwide.

The film won the Best Emerging Director prize at Locarno, the Best New Film Director award at the 52nd Golden Horse Awards, and the Golden Montgolfiere Prize at the 37th Three Continents Festival in Nantes.

References

External links
 Kaili Blues at Grasshopper Film
 
 
 
 

Chinese mystery drama films
Films directed by Bi Gan
Films shot in Guizhou